The Taipei Economic and Cultural Office in Brazil (Portuguese: Escritório Econômico e Cultural de Taipei no Brasil) represents the interests of Taiwan in Brazil in the absence of formal diplomatic relations, functioning as a de facto embassy. Its counterpart in Taiwan is the Commercial Office of Brazil to Taipei in Taipei.
 
There is also a Taipei Economic and Cultural Office in São Paulo, Brazil's largest city. This was formerly known as the Centro Comercial de Taipei no Brasil.
The Office is headed by a Representative, Isaac Tsai.

Representatives
 Shyu Guang-pu
 Isaac Tsai

See also
 Brazil–Taiwan relations
 List of diplomatic missions of Taiwan
 List of diplomatic missions in Brazil

References

External links
Escritório Econômico e Cultural de Taipei no Brasil

Brazil
Taiwan
Brazil–Taiwan relations